Sergey Georgyevich Kara-Murza (born January 23, 1939, in Moscow) is a Soviet and Russian chemist, historian, political philosopher and sociologist.

Biography 
Sergey Kara-Murza was graduated with degree in chemistry from Moscow State University in 1961.  Between 1966 and 1972 he worked as a Soviet chemical specialist in Cuba.

In 1983 Sergey Kara-Murza defended his doctoral thesis in history of science and technology and in 1988 became a professor.

Sergey Kara-Murza taught in Russia and Spain and authored several publications and academic studies dedicated to history, science and society.
His theory that the golden billion, the population of the most developed countries (including the poor) lives off the rest of humanity, is popular in the Russian-speaking world.
His most prominent works: Mind Manipulations published in 2000 was dedicated to establishing and describing the problem of manipulation of public opinion by pro-Western mass media in Russia and Soviet Civilization, a work about history, political and economic organization of USSR. In the late 1990s and early 2000s Sergey Kara-Murza wrote a number of political and philosophical works on Eurocentrism, Globalization and Color revolutions. His articles were frequent in left-wing/nationalist Russian newspapers such as Pravda, Alexander Prokhanov's Zavtra and Soviet Russia.

Sergey Kara-Murza became known for his anti-globalization, anti-liberal and anti-Westernist views; however, he also rejects traditional Marxist ideology. He has sharply criticized the Russian economic reforms of the 1990s; he is in favor of a more collectivist economy. Having supported president Putin's policies he is opposed to 'color revolutions'.

He is a relative of Vladimir A. Kara-Murza and Vladimir V. Kara-Murza.

External links 

Articles in English 
Official page in Russian 
Sergey G. Kara-Murza's works online (in Russian)

1939 births
Living people
Scientists from Moscow
Anti-globalization writers
Russian political writers
Russian sociologists
Moscow State University alumni
Soviet chemists